Ilzaam is a 1954 Indian Hindi-language film directed by R. C. Talwar starring Meena Kumari, Kishore Kumar in lead roles. Madan Mohan gave the music of the film.

Plot 
The urban settled boy Rajan falls in love with a village happy-go-lucky girl Kamli but his mother is against their relationship. Situations occur when their relationship faces a blue. What happens next? Will they come together?

Cast
 Meena Kumari as Kamli
 Kishore Kumar as Rajan
 Shammi as Rekha
 Randhir as Lakhoo
 Om Prakash
 Meera Devi as Rajan's mother
 Jagdish Kanwar
 Jagdish Sethi
 Tiwari

Crew
Director – R. C. Talwar
Producer – Rafiq Anwar, R. C. Talwar
Dialogues – Ramanand Sagar
Screenplay – R. C. Talwar
Cinematography	– Madan Sinha
Music – Madan Mohan
Lyrics – Rajendra Krishan
Editing – Prakash Malhotra
Playback Singers – Manna Dey, Asha Bhosle, Kishore Kumar, Shamshad Begum and Sunder

Soundtrack
The film had eight songs in it. The music of the film was composed by Madan Mohan. Rajendra Krishan wrote the lyrics.

References

External links
 

1954 films
1950s Hindi-language films